Dyschirius thailandicus is a species of ground beetle in the subfamily Scaritinae. It was described by Fedorenko in 1996.

References

thailandicus
Beetles described in 1996